This is a list of known applications made to the United States Congress by the state legislatures for a Convention to propose amendments to the United States Constitution under Article V of the Constitution which provides in pertinent part:

A discussion on the history of this process can be found at Convention to propose amendments to the United States Constitution. In particular, theories as to the validity of rescission of applications may also be found there as well as in List of rescissions of Article V Convention applications. All known applications are listed here, noting if and when such an application was known to have been subsequently rescinded.

On January 6, 2015 the United States House of Representatives began the process of cataloging applications submitted to the House by the state legislatures with the adoption of a new provision in the House's parliamentary rules of procedure. Previously, all documents related to Article V Convention applications were administratively processed as memorials and only summarized in the House's portion of the Congressional Record and then referred to the House's Judiciary Committee. The Clerk of the House, on that office's webpage, has since listed some—but not all—applications and rescissions received by Congress' lower chamber since 1960. As this list may so easily be subsequently removed by a mere change in House rules, references to the actual Congressional Record are preferred.  In its portion of the Congressional Record, the United States Senate, by contrast, typically publishes the entire verbatim text of a state legislature's application for an Article V Convention rather than to merely summarize the application's content.  Once published verbatim in the Record, the Senate refers such memorials to its own Judiciary Committee.

The Congressional Record prior to 1876 is available through the Library of Congress, and online since 1995. In 1990, Judge Bruce Van Sickle and attorney Lynn M. Boughey compiled a list from the Congressional Record of state applications for an Article V Convention in the Hamline Law Review. Photocopies of the relevant sections of the Congressional Record have are available through Friends of the Article V Convention (FOAVC) for the gap in the electronically available Congressional Record.

Van Sickle-Boughey classification
In "A Lawful and Peaceful Revolution", Van Sickle and Boughey define five classifications of applications:

Class I: A call for a general convention, with no motivating issue listed
Class II: A call for a general convention, with a separate statement of proposed amendment or explicit statement that the convention may consider other amendments proposed by states
Class III: A call for a general convention tied to a proposed amendment
Class IV: A call for a convention, with language aimed to limit the convention to the issue presented
Class V: A call for a convention, with language to rescind the application from consideration for a convention if any other topic is to be covered

The following is added to this list, where the original text was not recorded in the Congressional Record:
Class ??: A note of an application without the actual text

Van Sickle and Boughey indicate which applications have been rescinded by their state by encasing these in parentheses, and make no note of which applications have led to amendments proposed by Congress.

In the table below, the classification of rescinded applications are stricken, with the year of rescission given in parentheses and a link to the record of the rescission. Those applications which lead to amendments proposed by Congress are listed in parentheses.

List of state applications for an Article V convention
Although all columns are sortable, applications are initially arranged by date approved by the state legislature or by date of entry into the Congressional Record. Application classes are encased in parentheses if Congress presented an amendment on the topic given and stricken if the state legislature has subsequently rescinded its application. All descriptions with six or more states have identical amendment text, unless specified. As of October 2020, only the Hawaii State Legislature has never approved an Article V convention application through both its upper chamber and its lower chamber during the same legislative session.

Counts by states
In 1929 Wisconsin presented a list of states having made applications for a convention exceeding the two-thirds requirement that was referred to the Senate Judiciary Committee, with no further action. In 2013 states began listing existing state applications when joining them.

Wisconsin 1929
In 1929 Wisconsin applied to Congress to perform their constitutional duty to call a convention, listing Alabama, Arkansas, California, Colorado, Delaware, Georgia, Idaho, Illinois, Indiana, Iowa, Kansas, Kentucky, Louisiana, Maine, Michigan, Minnesota, Missouri, Montana, Nebraska, Nevada, New Jersey, New York, North Carolina, Ohio, Oklahoma, Oregon, Pennsylvania, South Dakota, Tennessee, Texas, Utah, Vermont, Virginia, Washington, and Wisconsin as states having made an application for a convention. There were 48 states in 1929, so 32 applications would be required to call a convention. 35 states were named.

Links to the text of applications by all states except California and North Carolina are provided in the table above. A reference to an application by California has been found in the Congressional Record and the text of an application by South Carolina is given in the table above. It may be that North Carolina was mistakenly included for South Carolina. 

Three states, Missouri, Texas, and Wisconsin, had applied for a general convention. Eleven states listed had applied for a convention to prohibit polygamy (Delaware, Illinois, Michigan, Minnesota, Montana, Nebraska, Ohio, Oregon, South Dakota, Vermont, and Washington), plus South Carolina. Idaho had included the direct election of the President and Vice President with their request for direct election of Senators. Thus, 16 states clearly had outstanding applications.

Alabama and Georgia had outstanding issues from 1832 and 1833, making a less certain 18. Colorado, Indiana, Iowa, Kansas, Louisiana, Nevada, and Oklahoma would be added if we include class II requests for Direct Elections of Senators, for a total of 25.

The only known records for an application New York and Virginia are their ratification documents, before the Bill of Rights. New Jersey and Kentucky applied for a convention to prevent the Civil War, and class III applications for the Direct Election of Senators. Arkansas, Maine, Pennsylvania, Tennessee, and Utah only had documented class III applications for the Direct Election of Senators. California is most likely in this group. These ten states have applications that may have been mooted by amendments proposed by Congress.

Balanced Budget
The balanced budget application of Ohio in 2013 through that of Arizona in 2017—except North Dakota—include a list of previous state applications for a balanced budget. Wisconsin's 2017 application also does not contain such a list. These lists mostly extend the previous lists, except possibly omitting state applications from the same legislative session.

Arizona has the most complete list, including Alabama, Alaska, Arizona, Arkansas, Colorado, Florida, Georgia, Indiana, Iowa, Kansas, Louisiana, Maryland, Michigan, Mississippi, Missouri, Nebraska, Nevada, New Hampshire, New Mexico, North Carolina, North Dakota, Ohio, Oklahoma, Pennsylvania, South Dakota, Tennessee, Texas, Utah and West Virginia. This represents 29 states.

Applications for all of the states mentioned above can be found in the list. Additionally, rescinded applications can be found for Delaware, Idaho, Oregon and Virginia. In particular, Delaware is included in lists prior to their rescission in 2016, but not after.

Wyoming and Wisconsin have made recent applications not included by Arizona, while Maryland, Nevada, New Mexico, and Colorado have recently rescinded their applications. This suggests a current total of 27 states, seven short of the required 34.

Convention of States Resolution
The Convention of States Resolution includes fiscal restraints on the federal government, limiting the power and jurisdiction of the federal government, and limiting the terms of office of federal officials, including members of Congress.

A complete list of passed resolutions with vote summaries, filing dates, and related links can be found using the Convention of States website.

As of August 7, 2022, 19 of the 34 states needed have passed the resolution.

Wolf Pac Resolution
The Wolf Pac Resolution calls for regulation of election campaign donations and expenditures; end legal concept of "corporate personhood"; overturn 2010 U.S. Supreme Court decision in case of Citizens United v. Federal Election Commission. Rhode Island included a count of the states in their 2016 application.

Rhode Island has the most complete list, including the following five states: California, Illinois, New Jersey, Rhode Island and Vermont. All of these applications are included in the list, with no recent additions.

U.S. Term Limits
The U.S. Term Limits Resolution calls for limiting the terms of members of Congress. States passing applications are Florida in 2016, Alabama in 2018, Missouri in 2018 and 2022, West Virginia in 2021, and Wisconsin in 2022 for a total of five states.

Paulsen style application counts
Michael Stokes Paulsen holds that the applications for a convention alone should govern the convention. Thus, this section contains counts of applications based on groupings not excluded by the applications themselves.

Counts including class IV, V, or VI applications would be limited to those with the same description, and can be found by sorting the list by topic.

Class I and II Applications
Indiana, Missouri, Ohio, Texas, and Wisconsin have outstanding applications for a convention to propose amendments, with no accompanying issue.

Alabama has a request for a convention limiting tariffs, and South Carolina one for clarification on Amendment X, each implying that other amendments may be considered.

Class I, II, and III Applications
24 more states have outstanding class III applications. These are Arkansas, California, Colorado, Connecticut, Delaware, Illinois, Iowa, Kansas, Kentucky, Maryland, Massachusetts, Michigan, Minnesota, Mississippi, Nebraska, Nevada, New Mexico, North Dakota, Pennsylvania, Rhode Island, South Dakota, Vermont, Virginia, and Washington.

This gives a total of 31 states with known class I, II, or III applications. Three more applications would meet the 2/3rds requirement to call a convention.

Brennan style application counts
Thomas E. Brennan holds that, in 1982, it was necessary, desirable, and feasible to hold a convention. He lists the following counts in the introduction to his claim:

450 applications through 1980, plus 25 more since 1980, gives 475 total applications.
Applications from every state in the union (Hawaii's expired and did not call for a convention, 8 states have rescinded all applications, leaving 41).
36 states with more than six or more separate applications (Ten of those have since rescinded all or most of their applications, and five are not identified in the table above, but several states have five applications listed here).

See also
List of rescissions of Article V Convention applications
Convention to propose amendments to the United States Constitution
Second Constitutional Convention of the United States

References

External links
FoAVC Index to congressional records
FoAVC Tables of state applications
Colorado's procedurally-improper House Resolution No. 12-1003
Friends of the Article V Convention

Article Five of the United States Constitution
United States constitutional law
Politics of the United States